The American Standard Version (ASV), officially Revised Version, Standard American Edition, is a Bible translation into English that was completed in 1901 with the publication of the revision of the Old Testament. The revised New Testament had been released in 1900. It was previously known by its full name, but soon came to have other names, such as the American Revised Version, the American Standard Revision, the American Standard Revised Bible, and the American Standard Edition.

History
The American Standard Version, which was also known as The American Revision of 1901, is rooted in the work begun in 1870 to revise the King James Bible of 1611. This project eventually produced the Revised Version (RV) in the UK.  An invitation was extended to American religious leaders for scholars to work on the RV project. In 1871, thirty scholars were chosen by Philip Schaff. The denominations represented on the American committee were the Baptist, Congregationalist, Dutch Reformed, Friends, Methodist, Episcopal, Presbyterian, Protestant Episcopal, and Unitarian. These scholars began work in 1872. Three of the editors, the youngest in years, became the editors of the American Standard Revised New Testament: Drs. Dwight, Thayer and Matthew B. Riddle.

Suggestions from the American Revision Committee were accepted only if two-thirds of the British scholars agreed. This principle was supported by an agreement that if their suggestions were included in the appendix of the RV, the American Committee would not publish their version for 15 years. The appendix contained about three hundred suggestions.

The Revised Version New Testament was published in 1881, the Old Testament in 1885, and the Apocrypha in 1894, after which the British team disbanded. Unauthorized copies of the RV then appeared in the US, having the American team suggestions in the main text. This was possible because while the RV in the UK held a Crown copyright as a product of the University Presses of Oxford and Cambridge, this protection did not extend to the US where the text was not separately copyrighted. In 1898, Oxford and Cambridge Universities published their editions of the RV with some American suggestions included. However, these suggestions were reduced in number from those in the appendixes. Some of the Americanized editions by Oxford and Cambridge Universities had the title of "American Revised Version" on the cover of their spines. Some of Thomas Nelson's editions of the American Standard Version Holy Bible included the Apocrypha of the Revised Version. The Revised Version of 1885 and the American Standard Version of 1901 are among the Bible versions authorized to be used in services of the Episcopal Church and the Church of England.

In 1901, after the 15-year deferral agreement between the American and British Revisers expired, the Revised Version, Standard American Edition (ASV) was published by Thomas Nelson & Sons. It was copyrighted in North America to conserve the ASV text. In 1928, the International Council of Religious Education (the body that later merged with the Federal Council of Churches to form the National Council of Churches) acquired the copyright from Nelson and renewed it the following year. By the time the ASV copyright expired in 1957, interest in this translation had waned in favor of more recent versions, so textual corruption never became the issue with the ASV that it was with the RV.

The language of the ASV intentionally retained the King James Version's Elizabethan English. It was often printed using lower quality paper and binding, and was perceived to be excessively literal. It never achieved wide popularity, apart from some Protestant seminaries. The King James Version would remain the primary choice for American Protestant Christians and laypeople until the publication of the Revised Standard Version in 1952.

Features
There were two rationales for the ASV. One was to circumvent the unauthorized editions of the RV that had been circulating in the US. The other reason was to incorporate more suggestions from the American translators, since the British team used only a subset of those, even in their 1898 edition. While many of the American scholars' preferences were based on the differences between American and British English, others were based on differing scholarship. Consequently, some changes to the KJV text in the ASV were not made in the RV.

There are seven verses in the King James Bible where the divine name appears: Genesis 22:14, Exodus 6:3, Exodus 17:15, Judges 6:24, Psalm 83:18, Isaiah 12:2 and Isaiah 26:4 plus its abbreviated form, Jah, in Psalms 68:4. The English Revised Version (1881–1885, published with the Apocrypha in 1894) renders the Tetragrammaton as Jehovah where it appears in the King James Version, and another eight times in Exodus 6:2,6–8, Psalm 68:20, Isaiah 49:14, Jeremiah 16:21 and Habakkuk 3:19 plus as its abbreviated form, Jah, twice in Psalm 68:4 and Psalm 89:8. The reason for this change, as the Committee explained in the preface, was that "…the American Revisers… were brought to the unanimous conviction that a Jewish superstition, which regarded the Divine Name as too sacred to be uttered, ought no longer to dominate in the English or any other version of the Old Testament…" Other changes from the RV to the ASV included substituting "who" and "that" for "which" when referring to people, and Holy Ghost was dropped in favor of Holy Spirit. Page headings were added and footnotes were improved.

Revisions
The ASV has been the basis of seven revisions, a "refresh", and a paraphrase: 
the  
the  
the 
the 
the 
the New Heart English Bible, Jehovah Edition, 2010.
the Bibliotheca group American Literary Version, 2016.
the Refreshed American Standard Version, 2021. 
 (Kenneth N. Taylor's Bible paraphrase).
The Updated American Standard Version (UASV) 2022.

References

Further reading
Metzger, Bruce M. The Bible in Translation. pp. 101–3. Grand Rapids: Baker.
.

External links

Al Maxey on the ASV
Bible Gateway
The text of the ASV online
The American Standard Version of the Holy Bible
Holy-Bible.online - ASV
Scripture First - American Standard Version

 
 

1901 books
Bible translations into English
1901 in Christianity